The Virden Oil Capitals are a Canadian junior 'A' ice hockey team based in Virden, Manitoba.  The Oil Capitals are members of the Manitoba Junior Hockey League.

History

The franchise was founded as the Winnipeg Rangers in 1956.  The Rangers became the St. Boniface Saints in 1967 and later the Winnipeg Saints in 2000. The Oil Capitals were created in the spring of 2012 when a group of local investors purchased the Saints franchise and relocated it to Virden to play at newly constructed Tundra Oil & Gas Place. 

The team has won five Turnbull Cups (Rangers in 1961 and 1966; Saints in 1971, 1981, and 1994) and finished runner-up on seven occasions (Rangers in 1960; Saints in 1969, 1993, 2008, 2010, and 2012; Oil Capitals in 2018).

Season-by-season record
Note: GP = Games Played, W = Wins, L = Losses, T = Ties, OTL = Overtime Losses, GF = Goals for, GA = Goals against

Playoffs
1971 Won League, Won Man/Sask Championship, Lost Abbott Cup
St. Boniface Saints defeated West Kildonan North Stars 4-games-to-3
St. Boniface Saints defeated St. James Canadians 4-games-to-none
St. Boniface Saints defeated Kenora Muskies 4-games-to-none MJHL CHAMPIONS
St. Boniface Saints defeated Weyburn Red Wings (SJHL) 4-games-to-2 MAN/SASK CHAMPIONS
Red Deer Rustlers (AJHL) defeated St. Boniface Saints 4-games-to-none
1972 Lost Quarter-final
West Kildonan North Stars defeated St. Boniface Saints 4-games-to-1
1973 Lost Semi-final
St. Boniface Saints defeated West Kildonan North Stars 9-points-to-7
St. James Canadians defeated St. Boniface Saints 4-games-to-none
1974 Lost Semi-final
St. Boniface Saints defeated St. James Canadians 4-games-to-2
West Kildonan North Stars defeated St. Boniface Saints 4-games-to-none
1975 Lost Quarter-final
St. James Canadians defeated St. Boniface Saints 4-games-to-none
1976 Lost Quarter-final
St. James Canadians defeated St. Boniface Saints 4-games-to-1
1977 Lost Quarter-final
Kenora Thistles defeated St. Boniface Saints 4-games-to-2
1978 Lost Quarter-final
Kildonan North Stars defeated St. Boniface Saints 4-games-to-1
1979 Lost Semi-final
St. Boniface Saints defeated St. James Canadians 4-games-to-1
Kildonan North Stars defeated St. Boniface Saints 4-games-to-none
1980 Lost Quarter-final
Kildonan North Stars defeated St. Boniface Saints 4-games-to-2
1981 Won League, Won Turnbull Cup, Lost Anavet Cup
St. Boniface Saints defeated Kenora Thistles 4-games-to-none
St. Boniface Saints defeated St. James Canadians 4-games-to-1
St. Boniface Saints defeated Selkirk Steelers 4-games-to-1 MJHL CHAMPIONS
St. Boniface Saints defeated Thompson King Miners (NJHL) 3-games-to-none TURNBULL CUP CHAMPIONS
Prince Albert Raiders (SJHL) defeated St. Boniface Saints 4-games-to-1
1982 Lost Semi-final
St. Boniface Saints defeated St. James Canadians 4-games-to-2
Fort Garry Blues defeated St. Boniface Saints 4-games-to-none
1983 Lost Final
St. Boniface Saints defeated Kildonan North Stars 4-games-to-none
St. Boniface Saints defeated Fort Garry Blues 4-games-to-2
Dauphin Kings defeated St. Boniface Saints 4-games-to-1
1984 Lost Quarter-final
Kildonan North Stars defeated St. Boniface Saints 4-games-to-none
1985 Lost Quarter-final
Selkirk Steelers defeated St. Boniface Saints 4-games-to-1
1986 Lost Quarter-final
St. James Canadians defeated St. Boniface Saints 4-games-to-3
1987 Lost Semi-final
St. Boniface Saints defeated Steinbach Hawks 4-games-to-none
Winnipeg South Blues defeated St. Boniface Saints 4-games-to-none
1988 Lost Quarter-final
St. James Canadians defeated St. Boniface Saints 4-games-to-1
1989 Lost Quarter-final
Kildonan North Stars defeated St. Boniface Saints 4-games-to-none
1990 DNQ
1991 Lost Quarter-final
St. James Canadians defeated St. Boniface Saints 4-games-to-3
1992 Lost Quarter-final
Winnipeg South Blues defeated St. Boniface Saints 4-games-to-2
1993 Lost Final
St. Boniface Saints defeated Selkirk Steelers 4-games-to-none
St. Boniface Saints defeated Winnipeg South Blues 4-games-to-1
Dauphin Kings defeated St. Boniface Saints 4-games-to-none
1994 Won League, Lost Anavet Cup
St. Boniface Saints defeated Southeast Blades 4-games-to-1
St. Boniface Saints defeated St. James Canadians 4-games-to-1
St. Boniface Saints defeated Winkler Flyers 4-games-to-2 MJHL CHAMPIONS
Weyburn Red Wings (SJHL) defeated St. Boniface Saints 4-games-to-3
1995 Lost Semi-final
St. Boniface Saints defeated Southeast Blades 4-games-to-none
Winnipeg South Blues defeated St. Boniface Saints 4-games-to-3
1996 Lost Quarter-final
Winnipeg South Blues defeated St. Boniface Saints 4-games-to-3
1997 Lost Quarter-final
Selkirk Steelers defeated St. Boniface Saints 4-games-to-3
1998 Lost Quarter-final
Winnipeg South Blues defeated St. Boniface Saints 4-games-to-3
1999 Lost Semi-final
St. Boniface Saints defeated St. James Canadians 4-games-to-2
Winnipeg South Blues defeated St. Boniface Saints 4-games-to-3
2000 DNQ
2001 Lost Quarter-final
Winnipeg South Blues defeated Winnipeg Saints 4-games-to-3
2002 DNQ
2003 DNQ
2004 Lost Semi-final
Winnipeg Saints defeated Winkler Flyers 4-games-to-2
Selkirk Steelers defeated Winnipeg Saints 4-games-to-2
2005 Lost Quarter-final
Selkirk Steelers defeated Winnipeg Saints 4-games-to-1
2006 Lost Quarter-final
Selkirk Steelers defeated Winnipeg Saints 4-games-to-2
2007 Lost Semi-final
Winnipeg Saints defeated Winnipeg South Blues 4-games-to-3
Selkirk Steelers defeated Winnipeg Saints 4-games-to-none
2008 Lost Final
Winnipeg Saints defeated Winnipeg South Blues 4-games-to-1
Winnipeg Saints defeated Winkler Flyers 4-games-to-1
Portage Terriers defeated Winnipeg Saints 4-games-to-1
2009 Lost Semi-final
Winnipeg Saints defeated Neepawa Natives 4-games-to-none
Selkirk Steelers defeated Winnipeg Saints 4-games-to-2
2010 Lost Final
Winnipeg Saints defeated Winnipeg South Blues 4-games-to-none
Winnipeg Saints defeated Winkler Flyers 4-games-to-none
Dauphin Kings defeated Winnipeg Saints 4-games-to-none
2011 Lost Quarter-final
Selkirk Steelers defeated Winnipeg Saints 4-games-to-1
2012 Lost Final
Winnipeg Saints defeated Dauphin Kings 4-games-to-1
Winnipeg Saints defeated OCN Blizzard 4-games-to-2
Portage Terriers defeated Winnipeg Saints 4-games-to-1
2013 DNQ
2014 Lost Semi-final
Virden Oil Capitals defeated Swan Valley Stampeders 4-games-to-2
Dauphin Kings defeated Virden Oil Capitals 4-games-to-0
2015 Lost Semi-final
Virden Oil Capitals defeated Winkler Flyers 4-games-to-2
Portage Terriers defeated Virden Oil Capitals 4-games-to-0
2016 Lost Quarter-final
Winnipeg Blues defeated Virden Oil Capitals 4-games-to-3
2017 Lost Quarter-final
Winkler Flyers defeated Virden Oil Capitals 4-games-to-2
2018 Lost Final
Virden Oil Capitals defeated Selkirk Steelers 4-games-to-1
Virden Oil Capitals defeated Winkler Flyers 4-games-to-0
Steinbach Pistons defeated Virden Oil Capitals 4-games-to-2
2019 Lost Semi-final
Virden Oil Capitals defeated Selkirk Steelers 4-games-to-2
Portage Terriers defeated Virden Oil Capitals 4-games-to-0
2020 Playoffs cancelled
Virden Oil Capitals leading Winkler Flyers 2-games-to-1 when playoffs were cancelled due to COVID-19 pandemic2021 Playoffs cancelled2022 Lost Semi-finalVirden Oil Capitals defeated Waywayseecappo Wolverines 4-games-to-0Steinbach Pistons defeated Virden Oil Capitals 4-games-to-2''

External links
Virden Oil Capitals Official Website

References

Manitoba Junior Hockey League teams